South Stainley is a small village in the Harrogate District, in the county of North Yorkshire, England. Nearby settlements include the city of Ripon, the town of Harrogate and the village of Markington. South Stainley is on the A61 road. South Stainley has a pub and a place of worship, St Wilfrid's Church, which is a grade II listed structure.

The village is mentioned in the Domesday Book as having 30 plough lands and a meadow covering . The name has been recorded variously as Southe Stanley, South Stonley and Kyrke Staynelay. The name derives from the Old Norse of Nyrran Stanlege, which means Stony forest or glade clearing. The presence of the prefix Kirk is due to it having a church as opposed to North Stainley. The village sits on Stainley Beck, a tributary of the River Ure and the land is mostly magnesian limestone with a small outcrop of millstone grit around the village.

The population of the parish was 174 at the 2001 census, falling slightly to 172 at the 2011 census. In 2015, North Yorkshire County Council estimated the population to be 180.

The village is the principal settlement in the civil parish of South Stainley with Cayton.

References

External links 

 Genuki

Villages in North Yorkshire